SoHo 20 Gallery is a diptych painting by American artist Sylvia Sleigh containing portraits of the collective members of the New York art gallery SoHo 20 Gallery. It is oil on canvas with each panel measuring 72" X 96". Sleigh also created a group portrait of the A.I.R. Gallery members. The Brooklyn Rail stated that the paintings could be "read today like detailed history paintings that record the birth of the Feminist Art Movement".

In 2019 the SoHo 20 Gallery group portrait was included in the exhibition "Women Defining Themselves, Original artist of the SOHO20" at the Rowan University Art Gallery in Glassboro, New Jersey.

Members depicted in the painting
(identified in "The Power of Feminist Art") 

 Elena Borstein
 Barbara Colemen
 Maureen Connor
 May Ann Gillies
 Joan Glueckman
 Eunice Golden
 Marge Helenchild
 Cynthia Mailman
 Marion Ranyak
 Marilyn Raymond
 Rachel Rolon de Clet
 Halina Rusak
 Lucy Salick
 Rosalind Shaffer
 Sylvia Sleigh
 Eileen Spikol
 May Stevens
 Suzanne Weisberg
Sharon Wybrants

References 

1974 paintings
American art